Henry Minton may refer to:
 Henry A. Minton (1883–1948), American architect
 Henry Collin Minton (1855–1924), American theologian
 Henry McKee Minton (1870–1946), African-American doctor
 Henry Minton, American saxophonist, founder of Minton's Playhouse